
Gmina Jeżewo is a rural gmina (administrative district) in Świecie County, Kuyavian-Pomeranian Voivodeship, in north-central Poland.

The gmina contains part of the protected area called Wda Landscape Park.

Villages
Gmina Jeżewo contains the villages and settlements of Belno, Białe, Białe Błota, Buczek, Ciemniki, Czersk Świecki, Dubielno, Jeżewo, Krąplewice, Laskowice, Lipienki, Lipno, Nowe Krąplewice, Osłowo, Pięćmorgi, Piskarki, Skrzynki, Taszewko, Taszewo and Taszewskie Pole.

Neighbouring gminas
Gmina Jeżewo is bordered by the gminas of Dragacz, Drzycim, Osie, Świecie and Warlubie.

References
Polish official population figures 2006

Jezewo
Świecie County